Popular music pedagogy — alternatively called popular music education, rock music pedagogy, or rock music education — is a development in music education consisting of the systematic teaching and learning of popular music both inside and outside formal classroom settings. Popular music pedagogy tends to emphasize group improvisation and is more often associated with community music activities than fully institutionalized school music ensembles.

The origins of popular music pedagogy may be traced to the gradual infusion of rock music into formal schooling since the 1960s (in the UK, the USA, and elsewhere), however it has expanded as a specialization to include the offering of degree programs — including graduate degrees — in institutions of higher education. Some notable community institutions, such as Cleveland's Rock and Roll Hall of Fame and Museum and Seattle's Experience Music Project have also contributed to the development of popular music pedagogy through symposia and educational outreach programs.

The UK has pioneered the teaching of popular music, the first degree programme beginning as early as 1994 at Salford University. Postgraduate programmes were later introduced, for example at the Institute of Popular Music at the University of Liverpool. There are now more than 76 popular music studies degree programmes in the UK. These programs expanded when the UK government made popular music a core part of schools' music provision through the Curriculum 2000 developments. The effect rippled into other countries as well. Popular music is commonly taught in German speaking countries  and in Ghana, for example. It is also increasingly common in Australia. However, popular music courses tend to be based in newer institutions, rather than older more traditional ones, which often still focus principally on classical music.

Degree programs
Numerous institutions worldwide now offer popular music pedagogy as a component of their degree programs. The following is a partial list of institutions that offer advanced degree programs in popular music pedagogy and related fields:

Australia
Griffith University (B. Popular Music)

Denmark
Rhythmic Music Conservatory

Finland
Sibelius Academy
Metropolia University of Applied Sciences, Music Degree

Ireland
Cork School Of Music

The Netherlands
 Fontys Rockacademie, Tilburg
 Academie voor Popcultuur (Academy for Pop Culture), Leeuwarden

Norway
University of Agder. Department of Popular Music.

United Kingdom
Liverpool Institute of Performing Arts
University of Huddersfield
University of the West of Scotland
Goldsmiths, University of London

United States
Berklee College of Music
University of Southern California
Shenandoah University
Westminster Choir College

Popular music festivals in the United States of America  
Austin City Limits Music Festival - Austin, TX
Beale Street Music Festival - Memphis, TN
Bonnaroo Music Festival - Manchester, TN
CMJ Music Marathon - New York, NY
Coachella Valley Music and Arts Festival - Indio, CA
Counterpoint - Kingston Downs, GA
Electric Daisy Carnival - New York, NY
The Fest - Gainesville, FL
Firefly Music Festival - Dover, DE
Fun Fun Fun Fest - Austin, TX
Governors Ball Music Festival - New York, NY and Las Vegas, NV
Lollapalooza - Chicago, IL
Riot Fest - Chicago, IL
Rock the Bells - TBA
Sasquatch! Music Festival - Gorge, WA
South by Southwest - Austin, TX
TomorrowWorld - Chattahoochee Hills, GA
Ultra Music Festival - Miami, FL
Voodoo Experience - New Orleans, LA
Warped Tour - Various locations

See also
Music education
Musicology
Ethnomusicology
Popular music
Cultural studies

References

Bibliography 

Around the Sound: Popular Music in Performance, Education, and Scholarship - symposium proceedings (2001, Seattle: University of Washington Publications, for the Experience Music Project), 
Cooper, B. Lee & Condon, Rebecca A. The Popular Music Teaching Handbook: An Educator’s Guide to Music-Related Print Resources (Libraries Unlimited, 2004).
Davis, Sharon G. "That Thing you Do!: Compositional Processes of a Rock Band". International Journal of Education and the Arts 6 no. 16 (2005).
Green, Lucy. (2002). How Popular Musicians Learn: A Way Ahead for Music Education. Aldershot: Ashgate (2002). 
Hebert, David G. "Originality and Institutionalization: Factors Engendering Resistance to Popular Music Pedagogy in the U.S.A.." Music Education Research International 5, pp. 12–21 (2011).
Hebert, D. G. Jazz and Rock Music. In W. M. Anderson & P. S. Campbell (Eds.), Multicultural Perspectives in Music Education, Vol.1 (third edition) (pp. 112–127). Lanham, MD: Rowman-Littlefield Publishers (2011).	
Hebert, David G. & Campbell, Patricia Shehan "Rock Music in American Schools: Positions and Practices Since the 1960s." International Journal of Music Education 36 no. 1, pp. 14–22 (2000).
Lebler, Don "Popular Music Pedagogy: Peer Learning in Practice." Music Education Research 10 no. 2, pp. 93–213 (2008).
Oehler, Susan & Hanley, Jason "Perspectives of Popular Music Pedagogy in Practice: An Introduction." Journal of Popular Music Studies 21 no. 1, pp.2-19 (2009).
Powell, B; Krikun, A; & Pignato, J. M. “Something’s happening here!”: Popular music education in the United States. IASPM Journal, 5(1), 4-22 (2015). 
Rodriguez, Carlos Xavier (Ed.). Bridging the Gap: Popular Music and Music Education (2003, MENC).
Smith, G.D. (2014). Popular music in higher education. In G. Welch & I. Papageorgi (Eds.), Advanced Musical Performance: Investigations in Higher Education Learning, (pp. 33–48). Farnham: Ashgate.
Stimeling, T. & Katz, M. "Songwriting as Musicological Inquiry: Examples from the Popular Music Classroom." Journal of Music History Pedagogy 2 (2011).
Tønsberg, Knut. Value changes in Norwegian music education. From increased acceptance of rock to a reduced status for classical music? Nordic research in music education. Yearbook Vol, 14. 145-166. (2013).

External links
International Association for the Study of Popular Music (IASPM)
Association for Popular Music Education (APME)
International Society for Music Education
MayDay Group
Experience Music Project
Rock and Roll Hall of Fame and Museum
Dr Fung's International Music Education Links
Visions of Research in Music Education

Occupations in music
Rock music